Syntaxin 11, also known as STX11, is a human gene that is a member of the t-SNARE family.

Interactions 

STX11 has been shown to interact with SNAP25 and SNAP23.

See also 
 Hemophagocytic lymphohistiocytosis

References

Further reading